Stephan Letter (born 17 September 1978) is a German serial killer and former nurse responsible for the murder of at least 29 patients while he worked at a hospital in Sonthofen, Bavaria, between January 2003 and July 2004. His murders have been described as the largest number of killings in Germany since the Second World War.

Biography
Letter was a nurse at a hospital that treated a large elderly population. During his employment from January 2003 to July 2004, a pattern of more than 80 deaths occurred on his shifts. Officials exhumed the bodies of more than 40 patients, but another 38 had already been cremated. Letter became a suspect after officials learned that large quantities of drugs, including the paralytic drug Lysthenon, had gone missing from the hospital. Unsealed medication vials were found in Letter's apartment.

In February 2006, Letter was brought to trial for the deaths of 29 patients. His charges included 16 counts of murder, 12 counts of manslaughter and one count of killing on request. Most of the patients were older than 75, but they ranged in age from 40 to 94. Letter also reportedly gave an inappropriate injection to a 22-year-old soldier with minor injuries from a fall; she lost consciousness but recovered. Letter confessed to some of the killings but insisted that he had acted out of sympathy and a desire to end the suffering of sick patients. However, the prosecution indicated that Letter was not the assigned nurse for some of the patients and that some of them were in stable condition and due to be released from the hospital. In November, Letter was found guilty of the murders and was sentenced to life imprisonment. He is imprisoned in Straubing.

Letter's killings have been characterized as the worst killing spree in Germany since the Second World War.

See also 
 Serial killers with health related professions
 List of serial killers by number of victims

References

External links
BBC news entry.

1978 births
German people convicted of murder
German prisoners sentenced to life imprisonment
German serial killers
Living people
Male nurses
Male serial killers
Medical serial killers
Nurses convicted of killing patients
People convicted of murder by Germany
People from Herdecke
Poisoners
Prisoners sentenced to life imprisonment by Germany